Nicholas Fernandes  is an Indian professional footballer who plays as an attacking midfielder for Martyr's Memorial A-Division League side New Road Team.

Club career

In India
Born in Goa, Fernandes started his career with Churchill Brothers in the Goa Professional League. Before the 2015–16 I-League, Fernandes was loaned to Sporting Goa. He made his professional debut for the club in their opening match of the season against East Bengal. He played 65 minutes as Sporting Goa lost 3–1.

In 2020, he moved to Gokulam Kerala FC. He debuted for the Malabarians on 9 January in a 3–2 defeat to Chennai City. He played his last match on 21 February against NEROCA in their 3–2 loss.

In March 2021, Fernandes signed with FC Bengaluru United for season-long deal. He was part of the team's 2020–21 season of the BDFA Super Division League win.

In Nepal
In October 2021, Fernandes moved to Nepal and signed with Martyr's Memorial A-Division League side Three Star Club for their 2021 season as a SAARC-quota player.

Few days later, he moved to another Martyr's Memorial A-Division League side Jawalakhel Youth Club for season-long deal. He debuted for the club on 21 November in a 1–0 defeat to Manang Marshyangdi Club. He scored his first goal on 18 December against Chyasal Youth Club in their 1–0 win. He scored his second goal on 27 December in their 2–0 win against Satdobato Youth Club.

On June 23, 2022, another Nepali outfit New Road Team announced the signing of nine new faces including Fernandes as SAARC quota player from India, and set on the pre-season tour to Malaysia and Thailand. In a statement issued by the club's general secretary Narendraman Shrestha, NRT will participate in the inaugural tournament Tuan Yang Terut Cup (TYT Cup) in Penang, Malaysia, organized by Melaka United, in the pre-season targeting the upcoming A-Division league. On 30 June, he was selected in the starting eleven and appeared in the tournament opener against Indonesian Liga 2 side Karo United in their 5–1 defeat. They again suffered a heavy defeat, by 5–0, in their second match against Malaysia Super League side Penang.

Career statistics

Honours
Sporting clube de Goa
Goa Professional League: 2015–16
Bengaluru United
Bangalore Super Division: 2020–21

See also
List of Indian football players in foreign leagues

References

External links
 
 
 Nicholas Fernandes at Everything For Football
 

Living people
Indian footballers
Churchill Brothers FC Goa players
Sporting Clube de Goa players
Association football midfielders
Footballers from Goa
Goa Professional League players
I-League players
Year of birth missing (living people)
Gokulam Kerala FC players
I-League 2nd Division players
FC Bengaluru United players
Indian expatriate footballers
Expatriate footballers in Nepal